The Trade with Africa Act 1697, also known as An Act to settle the Trade to Africa was a law passed by the Parliament of England to officially revoke the monopoly enjoyed by the Royal African Company in the African slave trade.

Instead the act introduced taxation on those involved in the "triangular trade" whereby merchants would be liable to pay ten per cent tax for the maintenance of the forts and castles between Cape Mount and the Cape of Good Hope which belonged to the company. The new regulations came into effect on 24 June 1698.

Text 
The act begins with the following:

Whereas the Trade to Africa is highly beneficial and advantagious to this Kingdom and to the Plantations and Colonies thereunto belonging and whereas Forts and Castles are undoubtedly necessary for the preservation and well carrying on the said Trade<p>And whereas the Forts and Castles now on the said Coast of Africa have been, and now are maintained at them sole Cost and Charge of the present Royal African Company of England towards which Charge it is most reasonable that all Persons tradeing to such Parts of the said Coast of Africa as are herein after, limited and appointed should contribute<p>Be it therefore enacted by the Kings most Excellent Majesty and by and with the Advice and Consent of the Lords Spiritual and Temporal and Commons in Parliament assembled and by the Authority of the same That from and after the Four and twentieth Day of June in the Year One thousand six hundred ninety & eight the said Royal African Company their Successors and Assigns by and with their Stock and Duties herein after appointed to be paid shall maintain support and defend all such Forts and Castles as the said African Company now have in their Possession or shall hereafter purchase or erect for the Preservation Improvement and well carrying on the said Trade and those Forts and Castles from time to time and at all times hereafter as occasion shall require shall supply with Men Artillery Ammunition and Provision and all other Necessaries and incident Charges whatsoever.

Effects 
Among other provisions, the Act opened the African trade to all English merchants who paid a ten per cent levy to the Royal African Company on all goods exported from Africa.

The company was unable to withstand competition on the terms imposed by the Act and in 1708 became insolvent, surviving until 1750 in a state of much reduced activity.

References

1697 in law
1697 in England
Acts of the Parliament of England